is the term for a championship in Japanese. This article focuses on championships in the sport of professional sumo.

It is awarded in each of the six annual honbasho or official tournaments, to the wrestler who wins the most bouts. Yūshō are awarded in all six professional sumo divisions. The prize money for a top makuuchi division championship is currently 10 million yen, while for the lowest jonokuchi division the prize is 100,000 yen. A runner-up is referred to as a jun-yūshō.

Perhaps surprisingly, considering that most of the interest in tournaments today revolves around who will win the yūshō, the concept of a prize for a wrestler's individual performance is a relatively recent one. Legendary wrestlers such as Tanikaze and Raiden are credited today with winning many championships, but they are all unofficial and are really nothing more than a "best tournament record."

The individual yūshō idea evolved gradually, from wrestlers simply picking up cash thrown into the ring by spectators after winning exciting matches (common in the Edo period), to wrestlers being given trophies and prizes from private sponsors for performances over an entire tournament (beginning in the Meiji period). Trophies were at first given only for undefeated records, but since draws, no decisions and absences were all possible outcomes, several wrestlers could be eligible and it did not necessarily go to the man with the most wins.

In January 1900, the system recognised today began to take shape when the Osaka Mainichi Shinbun newspaper announced it would give a prize of a keshō-mawashi decorative apron for either an undefeated record or for the fewest losses, and in the event of a tie, the wrestler who had defeated the most high-ranking opponents would win the prize. Thus the principle of an individual champion was established. Takamiyama Torinosuke's victory in June 1909 was the first to be declared a yūshō, and the system was formally recognised by the Japan Sumo Association in 1926 when the Tokyo and Osaka organisations merged.

From June 1909 to October 1931 and from January 1940 to July 1947, there was also a group competition called . The wrestlers were divided into two teams, East and West, and it was the team with the better overall score that was awarded a prize.

Though as noted, all six divisions award a championship, the top division championship receives by far the most attention. It was changed to its current name upon Hirohito's accession to the emperor's throne in December 1926. There is also a banner with the names of past winners. Both are presented by the chairman of the Sumo Association. There are also many prizes and trophies given by prefectural and foreign governments, as well as businesses. For several years the French President Jacques Chirac, a noted sumo fan, donated a trophy. The wrestler is given replicas of all the trophies to keep. In July 2010, and again in May 2011, neither the Emperor's Cup nor any other prizes were handed out, because of controversies over illegal betting and match-fixing respectively. However, in both cases the yūshō were still official and counted on the wrestlers' records.

An unbeaten 15-0 score is known as zenshō-yūshō and is fairly rare; most yūshō winning scores are either 14-1 or 13-2. The wrestler who has won the most top division yūshō is Hakuhō with 45, followed by Taihō with 32, and Chiyonofuji with 31. Futabayama won 12 yūshō in an era when only two tournaments were held each year.

The first foreign wrestler to win the makuuchi division yūshō was the Hawaiian born Takamiyama Daigorō in June 1972. There were no others until Konishiki Yasokichi won his first championship in November 1989. However, due to the unprecedented dominance of foreign wrestlers in recent years, led by the  Mongolian yokozuna Asashōryū and Hakuhō, there were no Japanese-born winners between Tochiazuma Daisuke in January 2006 and Kotoshōgiku in January 2016. This drought of Japanese Yusho winners was broken by Kisenosato, who won in January 2017, securing his Yokozuna promotion, and again in March of the same year. The past few years have also brought multiple other Japanese champions.

Playoffs
Any playoffs are indicated on individual wrestler articles' tournament records as one P for every other playoff challenger the wrestler faced in that tournament. 
Since 1947 a playoff system (kettei-sen) has been in place to determine the winner of the yūshō if two or more wrestlers finish with an identical score. Until then, the yūshō would go to whoever was the higher in rank, as it was presumed they had faced better quality opposition, but this caused controversy in 1928, when ōzeki Hitachiiwa was chosen over maegashira Misugiiso despite the fact that one of his wins had come by default. There was similar criticism when new maegashira Chiyonoyama was denied a championship in November 1945, despite winning all his matches.

Playoffs with more than two wrestlers involved are fairly common in lower divisions, but have only happened a handful of times in the top division. A three way playoff occurred three times in the 1990s, with a four way playoff in March 1997 and a unique five way playoff in November 1996. In such cases lots are drawn to decide who fights first, and the first wrestler to win two consecutive bouts takes the yūshō. A playoff is the only occasion in which wrestlers from the same stable (or heya'') and relatives can meet in tournament competition. The wrestlers who have taken part in the most top division playoffs are Takanohana II with ten (won five, lost five) and Hakuhō with ten (won six, lost four). Chiyonofuji has the highest percentage of victories, with a perfect 6-0 playoff record.

See also
Glossary of sumo terms
List of sumo tournament top division champions
List of sumo tournament second division champions
List of sumo tournament top division runners-up
List of sumo record holders

References

Sumo terminology
Sport in Japan